Ana Clavel (born December 16, 1961) is a Mexican writer.

She was born in Mexico City and studied literature at the National Autonomous University of Mexico.

Her more recent novels have incorporated "multimedia" elements such as art and photography installations and video performance.

Selected works 
 Fuera de escena (Out of the picture), short stories (1984)
 Los deseos y su sombra (Desire and its shadows), novel (1999)
 Amorosos de atar (Mad lovers), short stories (1992)
 Amorosos de atar (Trembling paradise), short stories (2002)
 Cuerpo náufrago (Shipwrecked body), novel (2005)
 Las Violetas son flores del deseo (Violets are flowers of desire), novel (2007), French translation Les Violettes sont les fleurs du désir received the Prix Juan Rulfo awarded by Radio France internationale
 Las ninfas a veces sonríen (2013), received the Elena Poniatowska Ibero-American Novel Prize

References 

1961 births
Living people
Mexican women novelists
Mexican women short story writers
Mexican short story writers
Writers from Mexico City